WGOP (540 AM) is a commercial radio station licensed to Pocomoke City, Maryland. Currently silent, the station most recently featured an oldies/MOR format. Owned by Birach Broadcasting and operated under a local marketing agreement (LMA) with Mike Powell, the station is one of a few in Birach's portfolio to feature a general entertainment format, whose specialty is brokered ethnic formats. In addition to a standard analog transmission, WGOP had been relayed over low-power translator W293DN.

On August 18, 2022, the station was destroyed in an accidental fire.

History
On January 19, 1955, the Federal Communications Commission (FCC) approved an application for a new 500-watt, daytime-only radio station on 540 kHz in Pocomoke City by G. Russell Chambers, trading as Eastern Shore Broadcasting Company. WDVM began to air on August 1 and was the second radio station on the Lower Eastern Shore. It was allowed to begin 1,000-watt broadcasting in 1957 but forfeited the authorization. The call sign was changed from WDVM to WDMV in 1959, after it was purchased by Ernest Tannen. An additional facility in Salisbury was added in 1962.

Tannen sold his radio holdings, which included WDMV and stations in Annapolis and Chester, Pennsylvania, in the 1970s to devote himself to other ventures. Leisure Time Communications acquired WDMV in 1973, followed by Mesta Communications in 1978. It switched from Top 40 to country music in 1980.

WDMV was silent for several years in the mid-1990s. The station used the WDMV call letters up until July 1, 2004, when it exchanged call signs with 700 kHz in Walkersville, Maryland, to become WGOP.

In April 2015, WGOP switched formats from Oldies to Sports Talk Radio, branded as SportsRadio 540. Later the format changed to classic country music and then to oldies, including sports such as Baltimore Orioles baseball.

On August 18, 2022, WGOP was destroyed by a fire caused by a faulty electrical wire in the attic of the studio building. Fifty firefighters took three hours to put out the blaze. The building was not insured and has been declared a total loss, but rebuilding is planned.

Former programming
Over the years, the station has been home to several formats. It once programmed an urban gospel format, as well as oldies, country music and even simulcast LMA partner WBEY-FM (97.9 FM).  Party Line on WBEY-FM was once simulcast on WGOP, until the station went to a sports radio format. Circa late 1950s "Mama's Country Youngin" Eddie Matherly was a popular WDMV personality.

In the early 1960s the station's music format "Delmarvarama" featured "America's Best Loved Music And Song." During that era the station promoted itself as "Big Signal Radio" in reference to its 540 AM frequency which in those days covered much of the lower and mid Eastern Shore with a strong signal. Its low frequency and abundance of water in the Eastern Shore area still allows the signal to blanket up to DC's southern suburbs, down to all of the Tidewater/Virginia Beach metro and into North Carolina.

Radio shows that formerly aired on both WBEY and WGOP include The Oldies but Goodies Show on Saturday nights, The Old Country and Bluegrass Show on Sunday nights and Light and Easy Cafe on Monday nights.

References

External links

GOP
Radio stations established in 1955
Oldies radio stations in the United States
1955 establishments in Maryland
Birach Broadcasting Corporation stations